The 21st San Diego Film Critics Society Awards were announced on December 12, 2016.

Winners and nominees

Best Film
Hell or High Water
La La Land
Manchester by the Sea
Moonlight
Nocturnal Animals

Best Director
David Mackenzie – Hell or High Water
Damien Chazelle – La La Land
Tom Ford – Nocturnal Animals
Barry Jenkins – Moonlight
Kenneth Lonergan – Manchester by the Sea

Best Male Actor
Casey Affleck – Manchester by the Sea
Adam Driver – Paterson
Joel Edgerton – Loving
Ryan Gosling – La La Land
Jake Gyllenhaal – Nocturnal Animals
Chris Pine – Hell or High Water
Viggo Mortensen – Captain Fantastic

Best Female Actor
Sônia Braga – Aquarius
Annette Bening – 20th Century Women
Ruth Negga – Loving
Natalie Portman – Jackie
Emma Stone – La La Land

Best Male Supporting Actor
Mahershala Ali – Moonlight (TIE) 
Ben Foster – Hell or High Water (TIE)
Jeff Bridges – Hell or High Water
Michael Shannon – Nocturnal Animals
Aaron Taylor-Johnson – Nocturnal Animals

Best Female Supporting Actor
Michelle Williams – Manchester by the Sea
Judy Davis – The Dressmaker
Greta Gerwig – 20th Century Women
Lily Gladstone – Certain Women
Nicole Kidman – Lion

Best Comedic Performance
Ryan Gosling – The Nice Guys
Julian Dennison – Hunt for the Wilderpeople
Alden Ehrenreich – Hail, Caesar!
Kate McKinnon – Ghostbusters
Ryan Reynolds – Deadpool

Best Original Screenplay
Taylor Sheridan – Hell or High Water
Damien Chazelle – La La Land
Efthimis Filippou and Yorgos Lanthimos – The Lobster
Barry Jenkins and Tarell Alvin McCraney – Moonlight
Kenneth Lonergan – Manchester by the Sea

Best Adapted Screenplay
Whit Stillman – Love & Friendship
Luke Davies – Lion
Tom Ford – Nocturnal Animals
Eric Heisserer – Arrival
Taika Waititi – Hunt for the Wilderpeople

Best Animated Film
Kubo and the Two Strings
April and the Extraordinary World
Long Way North
Moana
Zootopia

Best Documentary
Weiner
De Palma
Gleason
O.J.: Made in America
Tower

Best Foreign Language Film
Mountains May Depart
Aquarius
The Handmaiden
A Man Called Ove
Mother
Neruda

Best Cinematography
Giles Nuttgens – Hell or High Water
James Laxton – Moonlight
Seamus McGarvey – Nocturnal Animals
Linus Sandgren – La La Land
Bradford Young – Arrival

Best Costume Design
Mary Zophres – La La Land
Suzy Benzinger – Café Society
Marion Boyce and Margot Wilson – The Dressmaker
Madeline Fontaine – Jackie
Eimer Ní Mhaoldomhnaigh – Love & Friendship

Best Editing
Blu Murray – Sully
Tom Cross – La La Land
Jake Roberts – Hell or High Water
Joan Sobel – Nocturnal Animals
Joe Walker – Arrival

Best Production Design
Jess Gonchor – Hail, Caesar!
Jean Rabasse – Jackie
Anna Rackard – Love & Friendship
Shane Valentino – Nocturnal Animals
Patrice Vermette – Arrival
David Wasco – La La Land

Best Visual Effects
The Jungle Book
Arrival
Doctor Strange
La La Land
A Monster Calls

Best Use of Music in a Film
Sing Street
Everybody Wants Some!!
Hell or High Water
Jackie
La La Land

Breakthrough Artist
Lily Gladstone – Certain Women
Julian Dennison – Hunt for the Wilderpeople
Alden Ehrenreich – Hail, Caesar! and Rules Don't Apply
Lucas Hedges – Manchester by the Sea
Anya Taylor-Joy – The Witch

Best Ensemble
Hell or High Water
20th Century Women
Hidden Figures
Moonlight
Nocturnal Animals

Best Body of Work
Michael Shannon for Elvis & Nixon, Loving, Midnight Special, and Nocturnal Animals

References

External links
 Official Site

2016
2016 film awards
2016 in American cinema